"Pork and Burns" is the eleventh episode of the twenty-eighth season of the American animated television series The Simpsons, and the 607th episode of the series overall. It aired in the United States on Fox on January 8, 2017.

Plot
The Simpsons go to the Springfield Car Wash, and Marge buys a book called The Japanese Warrior Monks Guide to Tidying Up. Homer buys some sushi and ends up in the hospital. The family reunites at home and she makes the family follow the book's teaching, giving up everything that doesn't give them joy any more. Lisa gives up some of her Malibu Stacy dolls, Bart tells Marge all his stuff gives him joy, while Homer gives up his Mr. Plow jacket. Marge however tells him he has to give up Plopper, and find him a new place to live, so he puts an announcement on Greg's list. The first one to offer it is Snake, but Homer refuses, getting in a panel van to navigate back home.

Bart, Lisa and Homer with Plopper go to Luigi's and see Joyce Carol Oates at a table, but when trying to enter with the pig, Luigi forbids them, unless Plopper becomes a therapy animal. Homer prepares to make Plopper one, but Lisa gets worried of him getting in trouble and gets an anxiety attack, and Homer gets the idea to get a prescription for anxiety at Dr. Bud's Medicinal Marijuana Clinic, but he turns out to be a charlatan, so he turns to Dr. Nick, who gives him some pills. Lisa gets rid of every object in her room, and finds out the sax doesn't give her joy anymore. Meanwhile, Homer brings Plopper at the Power Plant, placing him on his seat, and says to Marge that he'll bring him everywhere he goes so she won't see him for long anymore.

At the Springfield nuclear family day picnic, Lisa gives up her saxophone. Plopper gets greased up by kids, leading to Mr. Burns' hounds attacking him, and biting his back. Dr. Budgie visits him, and to avoid a lawsuit, Burns and Smithers agree to take care of him. Back at home, Lisa is empty of any joy since she gave away all of her stuff, so Bart helps her at school, playing the music she likes over the intercom. She gets her joy back, but is missing her stuff, so Marge takes her to Springfield Lock 'N' Leave Storage Facility and reveals she kept all the stuff there, and go and retrieve them, disturbing Gil. At Burns Manor, Dr. Budgie gives Plopper a makeover, and Burns has some great moments with the pig, becoming reluctant to give him up once he recovers. Homer comes to check on him and sees Burns dancing with him. He then returns to the manor that evening and gets back his animal friend with Bart's and later Smithers' help, and to keep him he says to Marge he will give up beer. That night, Homer has a dream of a Hellman's Mayonnaise cartoon, similar to one he had earlier, and wakes up from the nightmare after seeing they prepared hamburgers with fruit in the sides. This scene is a parody of the opening theme to ER.

Reception
Dennis Perkins of The A.V. Club gave the episode a B− stating, "But why graft three full stories (and possibly a fourth) together into one resultingly cluttered episode? It’s a common complaint, but a lot of recent Simpsons episodes waste promising storylines this way. You’ve got Homer and his pig buddy, coming back together before a barbeque sauce-and-hounds mishaps leads to Mr. Burns taking a shine to the injured Plopper. But that’s only set up by Marge’s enthusiasm for a Japanese anti-cluttering book/philosophy that sees her urging the family to toss out anything that 'no longer brings them joy' (that’s an episode), which leads to Lisa discovering that, once she’s given away everything but her sax (and her Bleeding Gums Murphy poster), she’s lost all joy in playing. 'I finally feel about my sax the way you all do!,' she wails in horror. And that’s another episode. Throw in some promising emotional beats to that story—Homer comforts the confused Lisa during an anxiety attack, Bart hijacks the school’s PA system to restore her love for jazz—and there’s an abundance of good ideas not given enough time to come to fruition."

"Pork and Burns" scored a 3.5 rating with an 11 share and was watched by 8.19 million viewers, making it Fox's highest rated show of the night.

References

External links
 

The Simpsons (season 28) episodes
2017 American television episodes